The Prix Robert-Cliche is a literary prize created in 1979 to honour Robert Cliche, a Quebec lawyer, judge and politician. The prize is awarded annually for an original French language work by a Canadian author who has not previously published a novel. The manuscript must contain at least 30,000 words.

Winners 
1979 - Gaëtan Brulotte, L’Emprise
1980 - Madeleine Monette, Le Double Suspect
1981 - Robert Lalonde, La Belle Épouvante
1982 - Chrystine Brouillet, Chère voisine
1983 - Louise Leblanc, 37 1/2 AA
1984 - Danielle Dubé, Les Olives noires
1985 - Rachel Fontaine, Black Magic
1986 - Jean-Robert Sansfaçon, Loft Story
1987 - Louise Doyon, Les Héritiers
1988 - Raymond Beaudet, Passeport pour la liberté
1989 - Jean-Alain Tremblay, La Nuit des Perséides
1990 - Jean Fontaine, Les Lièvres de Saint-Giron
1991 - André Girard, Deux semaines en septembre
1992 - Gabrielle Gourdeau, Maria Chapdelaine ou le paradis retrouvé
1993 - Jacques Desautels, Le Quatrième Roi mage
1994 - Robert Gagnon, La Thèse
1995 - not awarded
1996 - Danielle Roy, Un Cœur farouche
1997 - Raymonde Lamothe, L’Ange tatoué
1998 - Michel Désautels, Smiley
1999 - Guy Moreau, L’Amour Mallarmé
2000 - Chantal Gevrey, Immobile au centre de la danse
2001 - Arlette Fortin, C’est la faute au bonheur
2002 - Mylène Gilbert-Dumas, Les Dames de Beauchêne
2003 - Gilles Jobidon, La Route des petits matins
2004 - Reine-Aimée Côté, Les Bruits
2005 - Roxanne Bouchard, Whisky et Paraboles
2006 - François X Côté, Slash
2007 - Stéphane Achille, Balade en train assis sur les genoux du dictateur
2008 - Danielle Trussart, Le Train pour Samarcande
2009 - Olivia Tapiero, Les Murs
2010 - Simon Lambert, La Chambre
2011 - Ryad Assani-Razaki,  La Main d'Iman
2012 - Judy Quinn, Hunter s'est laissé couler
2013 - Philippe Arseneault, Zora. Un conte cruel
2014 - Martin Clavet, Ma belle blessure
2015 - not awarded
2016 - Antoine Charbonneau-Demers, Coco
2017 - Philippe Meilleur, Maître Glockenspiel
2018 - Alice Guéricolas-Gagné, Saint-Jambe
2019 - Alexandre Michaud, Francis
2020 - not awarded
2021 - Paul Serge Forest, Tout est ori

References

External links
 

First book awards
Canadian fiction awards
Awards established in 1979
Quebec awards